Kalateh-ye Mir Ali may refer to:
 Kalateh-ye Mir Ali, Razavi Khorasan